The Martyr Sex is a 1924 American silent drama film directed by Duke Worne and starring William Fairbanks, Dorothy Revier and William Dyer. this film is now believed to be lost

Synopsis
In the rural South, a Doctor goes to a cabin where he amputates the arm of a brutish man Branch Paxton. Paxton later develops a vendetta gainst the doctor.

Cast
 William Dyer Horseshoe Sam
 William Fairbanks as Dr. Ross Wayne
 Les Bates as Branch Paxton
 Billie Bennett as His Wife
 Dorothy Revier as Beulah Paxton
 Pat Harmon as Lem Paxton
 Frank Hagney as Ed Carter

References

Bibliography
 Connelly, Robert B. The Silents: Silent Feature Films, 1910-36, Volume 40, Issue 2. December Press, 1998.

External links
 

1924 films
1924 drama films
1920s English-language films
American silent feature films
Silent American drama films
Films directed by Duke Worne
1920s American films